Whittaker is a name.

Whittaker may also refer to:

 Whittaker's, J.H. Whittaker & Sons, Ltd., a New Zealand confectionery manufacturer 
 Whittaker, Michigan, U.S.
 Whittaker, West Virginia, U.S.

See also

 Whitaker (disambiguation)
 Whitacre (disambiguation)
 Whittaker's sundew, Drosera whittakeri, a carnivorous plant
 Whittaker and Watson, colloquial name for mathematics textbook A Course of Modern Analysis
 Whittaker model and Whittaker function, mathematical spatial principles